Andrew "Andy" Michael Williams (born 14 March 1964) is a British knee and sports surgeon who specialises in ligament injuries. He is known for treating professional athletes, including Premier League footballers. and English Premiership rugby union players. Williams is a Reader at Imperial College London and co-founder of London musculoskeletal health centre Fortius Clinic.  He was named in The Times’ 2011 list of Britain’s top surgeons.

Biography

Williams qualified as a surgeon at King's College Hospital, London in 1987. He completed his orthopaedic training at the Royal National Orthopaedic Hospital in Stanmore in 1996, before undertaking a year-long fellowship in Brisbane, Australia in 1996-97 with Dr Peter Myers.

Williams is also a researcher and lecturer on knee-related issues. He is a Reader at Imperial College, London and an Honorary Senior Research Fellow at Nuffield Department of Orthopaedics, University of Oxford.

In 2014 Williams became a member of the ESSKA (European Society for Sports Traumatology, Knee Surgery and Arthroscopy) Sports Committee. He was also a board member at The Bone & Joint Journal for which he remains a reviewer as he is for The American Journal of Sports Medicine. He was a lead editor on the 39th edition of Gray's Anatomy.

Notable patients

Williams has treated a number of Premier League footballers and many at other levels, including Virgil van Dijk, Danny Welbeck, Andy Carroll, Theo Walcott, John Terry and David Turnbull. He treated international cricket players Andrew Flintoff and Shoaib Akhtar in 2009, former England rugby union captain Lawrence Dallaglio in 2011, and British Olympic snowboarder Billy Morgan in 2014.

References

Living people
British sports physicians
1964 births
Alumni of Imperial College London